Chismville is an unincorporated community in Washburn Township, Logan County, Arkansas, United States. It is located where Highway 217 terminates at Highway 23.

References

Unincorporated communities in Logan County, Arkansas
Unincorporated communities in Arkansas